Moapa may mean:

People
 Moapa Band of Paiute Indians

Places
 Moapa River Indian Reservation, an Indian Reservation in Southern Nevada that is home to some members of the Southern Paiute
 Moapa Town, Nevada, a small community of Southern Nevada
 Moapa Valley, Nevada, a valley in Southern Nevada in which the towns of Moapa, Logandale and Overton are located 
 Moapa Valley National Wildlife Refuge, a wildlife refuge at the headwaters of the Muddy River in Southern Nevada
 Muddy River (Nevada), previously called the Moapa River, a short river in Southern Nevada that flows from the Moapa Valley to Lake Mead

Other
 Moapa, the genus of the Moapa dace, a small, rare fish of Southern Nevada